Musa Muhamedovich Nastuyev (born January 22, 1976) is a Russian-Ukrainian judoka.

Achievements

References
 

1976 births
Living people
Ukrainian male judoka
Judoka at the 2004 Summer Olympics
Olympic judoka of Ukraine
Universiade medalists in judo
Universiade silver medalists for Russia
Sportspeople from Kabardino-Balkaria
Medalists at the 1999 Summer Universiade